Dafne in lauro (Daphne as a laurel tree) is a chamber opera, a componimento per camera, composed by Johann Joseph Fux to a libretto by Pietro Pariati and performed for the imperial court before dinner on 1 October 1714 in the Favorita garden, Vienna, for the birthday of Emperor Charles VI. The opera is based on the myth of Apollo and Daphne.

Roles
Apollo, with four arias, alto castrato – Gaetano Orsini (1667–1750)
Dafne, also with four arias – Maria Conti-Landini
Diana, soprano – Regina Schoonjans
Amore, sixteen-year-old soprano castrato – Giovanni Vincenzi
Mercurio, tenor – Silvio Garghetti

Recordings
Dafne in lauro, Mieke van der Sluis, Lina Akerlund, Gérard Lesne, Silvia Piccolo, Martin Klietmann. Clemencic Consort & La Capella Vocal Ensemble; René Clemencic; recorded 1990, Paris, 2CD Nuova Era
Dafne in Lauro, Conductor: Alfredo Bernardini; Zefiro, Recorded: June 2019, Graz, Austria - CD: ORF, Cat: A488
Dafne in lauro, Ensemble 415 Chiara Banchini 2CD 2021 Arcana

References

1714 operas
Operas based on Metamorphoses
Italian-language operas
Operas